Ragupathy Silambarasan (born 7 March 1993) is an Indian cricketer. He made his List A debut on 22 February 2021, for Tamil Nadu in the 2020–21 Vijay Hazare Trophy. He made his Twenty20 debut on 8 November 2021, for Tamil Nadu in the 2021–22 Syed Mushtaq Ali Trophy.

References

External links
 

1993 births
Living people
Indian cricketers
Tamil Nadu cricketers
Place of birth missing (living people)